The Turkish Radio and Television Corporation (TRT;) is the national public broadcaster of Turkey, founded in 1964. TRT was for many years the only television and radio provider in Turkey. Before the introduction of commercial radio in 1990, and subsequently commercial television in 1992, it held a monopoly on broadcasting. More recent deregulation of the Turkish television broadcasting market produced analogue cable television. Today, TRT broadcasts around the world, especially in Europe, Middle East, Africa, Asia, USA, and Australia.

Around 70% of TRT's funding comes from a tax levied on electricity bills and a license tax on television and radio receivers. As these are hypothecated taxes, as opposed to the money allocated to general government funds, the principle is similar to that of the television licence levied in a number of other countries, such as the BBC in the United Kingdom. The rest of TRT's funding comes from government grants (around 20%), with the final 10% coming from advertising.

History 

TRT's predecessor,  was one of 23 founding broadcasting organisations of the European Broadcasting Union in 1950; it would return to the EBU fold as TRT in 1972. The original company started radio test broadcasts in 1926, with a studio built in Istanbul in 1927 and a studio in Ankara following in 1928.

Test transmissions started on TRT 1 on 31 January 1968. A full national television schedule, which at that time linked the areas in and around Ankara, Istanbul, and İzmir, started in December 1971. TRT renewed its membership in the European Broadcasting Union (having been a founding member previously offering only radio) starting on 26 August 1972, with Turkey's first Eurovision Network event, a football match (Turkey vs. Italy), airing across Europe on 13 January 1973. TRT also joined the Asia-Pacific Broadcasting Union in 1976, the same year their first colour television test was showcased via laboratory at the general assembly of the Organisation of the Islamic Conference.

All programming was in black and white from the start of test transmissions in 1968 until the New Year's Eve programming on 31 December 1981, when the first on-air colour tests started. The entire lineup switched to colour on 15 March 1984.

TRT organised the Eurovision Song Contest 2004, with the semi-final on 12 May 2004 and the final on 15 May 2004.

On 19 May 2012, TRT 1 HD started simulcasting with TRT 1 upscaled to full HD 16:9 DVB-S2 standard.

In January 2018, TRT celebrated its 50th anniversary. All TRT channels broadcast a collection of old idents and news studio (still being modern logo) as part of the celebration in form of nostalgia. Each day new idents were made. This event also happened in 1978, 1988, 1998 and 2008.

Post-2016 coup attempt 

After the 15 July coup attempt, many people in TRT were either fired or forced workers to retire. According to Haber-Sen Union; 1800 of workers were forced to retire. The union protested this situation on 21 November 2018 in Istanbul, Ankara, Diyarbakir and Brussels. During the protests, TRT employees stated that they were exposed to psychological pressure defined as MOBING. TRT employee Osman Köse stated that more than 3,000 TRT employees have been transferred to other state institutions and 5,000 people have been dismissed from TRT.

Many of TRT employees were dismissed and sent to prison by the reason of the 15 July coup attempt. According to the list that published in the ‘Resmi Gazete’ of the state, 312 people were dismissed. According to the report provided by the non-governmental organisation-Sweden-based NGO Stockholm Center for Freedom (SCF), approximately 150 TRT employees were accused of being a member of a ‘terrorist organisation’. Many of them were arrested and imprisoned.

Services

Television channels 

All television channels can be watched via Turksat satellite in Europe in Asia and terrestrial in Turkey and neighbouring countries. Some of them are also found on cable TV systems.

Domestic 

 TRT 1 (launched January 1968) – General entertainment channel with a broad schedule featuring local and foreign series, Turkish and Hollywood cinema, live shows with Turkish folk music, Turkish classical music and pop music, live sport, news & current affairs plus special events.
 TRT 2 (launched September 1986, shut down March 2010, relaunched February 2019) – Highbrow channel with a broad schedule featuring cultural and educational shows, heavy promotion of the arts (Turkish and international), cultural talkshows, documentaries, and local and foreign films.
 TRT Spor (launched October 1989) – Live and archive sport including Formula 1, World and European Figure Skating Championships, World and European Athletics Championships, Turkish Women's Volleyball league, U18 Basketball plus feature programmes. When parliament is in session, TRT 3 relays live coverage of the Turkish Grand National Assembly (TBMM-TV).
 TRT Çocuk (launched November 2008) – Children's programming, animated programmes and educational programmes. The station now broadcasts 24 hours a day.
 TRT Kurdî (launched January 2009) – Channel broadcasting in Kurdish.
 TRT Arabi (launched April 2010) – Broadcasts 24 hours a day in Arabic language with programs aimed at Arabs in Turkey, as well as the wider Arab world and Middle East.
 TRT Müzik (launched November 2009) – 24-hour music channel with Turkish folk and classical music. It also airs pop, rock, jazz & ethnic music.
 TRT Belgesel (launched November 2009) – 24-hour documentary channel.
 TRT Haber (launched May 2010) – News and current affairs, sports news and weather.
 TRT 4K (launched February 2015) – Ultra HD television channel of TRT. This is the first 4K television channel in Turkey.
  (launched September 2019) – Alternate channel to TRT Spor.

International 

 TRT Türk (16:9, not encoded in DVB signal) (formerly known as TRT INT)  – International news, current affairs, documentaries and cultural programming aimed at both Turks and Turkish speaking audience living abroad. It's the first TRT channel to make extensive use of a private production company for news programming.
 TRT Avaz (formerly known as TRT Türk) (launched March 2009) – International channel aimed at the Turkic republics and Turks living in the Balkans. The channel has a focus on entertainment and documentaries as opposed to TRT Türk's new focus on news. Programmes are broadcast in a mixture of languages including Turkish, Azerbaijani, Kazakh, Uzbek and Turkmen.
 TRT World – International news, current affairs, documentaries and cultural programming in English for international audiences.

Minority languages 

TRT has a special TV channel for Kurdish that broadcasts on a 24-hour / 7-day basis called TRT Kurdî and other TV and Radio stations that broadcast programmes in the local languages and dialects like Armenian, Arabic, Bosnian and Circassian a few hours a week.

Another special TV channel aimed at the Turkic world, TRT Avaz was launched on 21 March 2009 and broadcasts in the Azerbaijani, Bosnian, Kazakh, Kyrgyz, Uzbek and Turkmen languages; while the TRT Arabic television channel started broadcasting on 4 April 2010.

Closing and opening times throughout the years 

1987: TRT 1 and TRT 2 close at midnight
2002: TRT 1 & 2 open 24/7. 3 and 4 open 7:00-0:30
Since 2010: all channels 24/7 (TRT 4/TRT Çocuk (4th channel of TRT) and TRT GAP/TRT Spor/TBMM-TV (3rd channel of TRT) couples are exception but in whole couples they broadcast 24/7 too.)

Radio channels 

 Radyo 1 (launched in May 1927) – spoken-word programmes including culture, arts, drama, news, science, society, education and history
 TRT FM (formerly Radyo 2, launched in January 1975) – A mixture of Turkish pop, folk and classical music, foreign pop, call ins, news and travel information
 Radyo 3 (launched in January 1975) – Classical music, jazz, world music, foreign pop & rock
  (launched in October 1987) – Turkish rap, R&B and Hip-Hop
  (formerly Radyo 6, launched in 2009) – Broadcasting in Kurdish language for Kurds in Turkey
  (launched in September 1993) – News programmes
 TRT Nağme – Turkish classical music
  – Broadcasting for Turks in Europe
 TRT Türkü – Turkish folk music and türkü
 Voice of Turkey (launched in December 1982) – Broadcasting with 26 different languages and around the World.

Regional channels 

 Antalya Radyosu – Broadcasting in Antalya, covers west Mediterranean Region, Turkey
 Çukurova Radyosu – Broadcasting in Mersin, covers east Mediterranean Region, Turkey
 Erzurum Radyosu – Broadcasting in Erzurum, covers Eastern Turkey
 Trabzon Radyosu – Broadcasting in Trabzon, covers Northern Turkey
 Radyo GAP – Broadcasting in Diyarbakır, covers South Eastern Turkey

Teletext and EPG 

TRT started teletext trial-runs with the name “Telegün” on 3 December 1990. All TV channels are broadcasting the teletext. 6 channels are also broadcasting their programs with the Electronic program guide (EPG).

News 

TRT offers online news services in Turkish and other languages.

 Afghani (Southern Uzbek)
 Albanian (TRT Balkan)
 Arabic
 Armenian
 Azerbaijani (Latin) / (Arabic script)
 Bosnian-Serbian-Croatian (TRT Balkan)
 Bulgarian
 Chinese
 Dari
 English (TRT World)
 French
 Georgian
 German
 Greek
 Hausa
 Hungarian
 Italian
 Japanese
 Kazakh
 Kurdish
 Kyrgyz
 Macedonian (TRT Balkan)
 Melayu
 Pashto
 Persian
 Portuguese
 Romanian
 Russian
 Spanish
 Swahili
 Tatar
 Turkish
 Turkmen
 Urdu
 Uyghur (Arabic/Latin/Cyrillic)
 Uzbek

Logos

See also 

 Timeline of broadcast in Turkey
 Media freedom in Turkey (covers censorship aspects)
 Media of Turkey
 Emel Gazimihal (first female speaker)

References

External links 

  
 TRT World 
 TRT Sales

 
Mass media in Turkey
Publicly funded broadcasters
Turkish-language television stations
Turkish-language radio stations
European Broadcasting Union members
Multilingual broadcasters
Radio stations established in 1964
Television channels and stations established in 1968
1964 establishments in Turkey
State media
Companies of Turkey